The first USS Hudson was a wooden hulled, three-masted sailing frigate in the United States Navy.

Hudson, formerly Liberator, was built in 1826 for the Greek government by Smith & Dimon of New York. When Greece was unable to pay for her, she was purchased by the Navy and commissioned at New York.

In 1828, Hudson began fitting out for what was to be her only cruise, and during this period was inspected by President John Quincy Adams and his entourage. The frigate sailed from New York on 28 September 1828 to serve as Commodore John Orde Creigton's flagship in the Brazil Squadron. From there Hudson conducted several patrols along the South American coast, stopping and boarding for inspection American as well as foreign ships. She also served as a harbor patrol vessel at Montevideo and Rio and cruised to Bahia and St. Catherine during her three years on station.

Hudson was constructed of unseasoned white oak, rather than seasoned live oak which was preferred by the U.S. Navy.  As a result, Hudson began to decay soon after her completion and was returned to the United States.

Hudson departed on 13 June 1831 and reached New York via Bahia on 5 August. She remained at New York as a receiving ship until 1844, when she was broken up and sold.

See also 
List of sailing frigates of the United States Navy
Sailing ship tactics

References 

Sailing frigates of the United States Navy